Turloughmore GAA is a Gaelic Athletic Association club based in the village of Turloughmore, County Galway, Ireland. The club is primarily concerned with the game of hurling.

Overview

History

Hurling had been played in the parish of Lackagh long before the establishment of the Gaelic Athletic Association in 1884. The formation of the Irish National League in 1882 as a follow up to the Land League, resulted in the setting up of a branch of the Gaelic Athletic Association being formed in the parish on 14 May 1886, which led to organised hurling games under proper rules.

Honours

Connacht Senior Club Hurling Championships: 1
 1985
Galway Senior Club Hurling Championships: 8
 1956, 1961, 1962, 1963, 1964, 1965, 1966, 1985
Galway Junior Club Hurling Championships: 5
 1907, 1949, 1954, 1991, 1997
Galway Minor Club Hurling Championships: 7
 1981, 1984, 1996, 1997, 2007, 2013, 2014

Notable players
 Daithí Burke
 Frank Burke
 Francis Forde
 Fergal Moore
 Martin Naughton
 P. J. Qualter
 Dylan Reilly
 Michael Shaughnessy

External links
Turloughmore GAA Club website

Gaelic games clubs in County Galway
Hurling clubs in County Galway